Pierre Zaïdin (26 May 1893 – 2 October 1956) was a French athlete. He competed in the men's hammer throw at the 1924 Summer Olympics.

References

External links
 

1893 births
1956 deaths
Athletes (track and field) at the 1924 Summer Olympics
French male hammer throwers
Olympic athletes of France